Lars Erik Lund (born 25 July 1974 in Oslo, Norway) is a Norwegian professional ice hockey player, who is currently playing for Vålerenga in GET-ligaen.

Club career
Lund has played for Vålerenga almost his whole career. The only exception was from 1999–2001, when he played two seasons for Frisk Tigers.

International career
Lund has played for the Norway national ice hockey team since 2004. He has also played in national youth teams from the age of 18.

18 April 2008, he got a puck in his face during a match against Switzerland. After 10 hours in the operating room, they managed to save his eye, but his injuries were so severe that he missed the 2008 IIHF World Championship in Canada.

Career statistics

Regular season and playoffs

International

References

External links

1974 births
Living people
Frisk Asker Ishockey players
Ice hockey players at the 2010 Winter Olympics
Norwegian ice hockey defencemen
Olympic ice hockey players of Norway
Ice hockey people from Oslo
Vålerenga Ishockey players